Liz Stringer is an Australian singer-songwriter, based in Melbourne, Victoria. As of April 2021, Stringer has released six studio albums, a live album and two extended plays. Since 2013 she has released with Mia Dyson and Jen Cloher music under the name Dyson Stringer Cloher.

Career
Stringer's debut studio album was released in 2006.

In August 2008, Stringer was invited by Deborah Conway to take part in the Broad Festival project, which toured major Australian cities including performing at the Sydney Opera House. With Stringer and Conway were Laura Jean, Dianna Corcoran and Elana Stone – they performed their own and each other's songs.

In August 2013 Stringer collaborated with Mia Dyson and Jen Cloher and formed Dyson Stringer Cloher. The trio released 
an EP which featured an individual track from each musician. They then took on the road, playing over 40 shows around the country.

In 2019, Stringer reunited with Dyson and Cloher. The trio recorded a self-titled album in eight days at The Loft in Chicago in April 2019, which was released in October 2019 and toured nationally.

In February 2021, it was announced that Stringer had signed with Milk! Records as a solo artist.
In April 2021, Stringer released her sixth studio album, First Time Really Feeling, recorded at Toronto's Union Sound Company and produced and engineered by Chris Stringer.

Discography

Albums

Extended plays

Awards

AIR Awards
The Australian Independent Record Awards is an annual awards night to recognise, promote and celebrate the success of Australia's Independent Music sector.

|-
|  2020
| Dyson Stringer Cloher 
| Best Independent Blues and Roots Album or EP
| 
|-
| rowspan="2"| 2022
| rowspan="2"| First Time Really Feeling
| Independent Album of the Year
| 
|-
| Best Independent Blues and Roots Album or EP
|

APRA Awards
The APRA Awards are presented annually from 1982 by the Australasian Performing Right Association (APRA), "honouring composers and songwriters". They commenced in 1982.

! 
|-
| 2022 
| "Dangerous" (Liz Stringer)
| Song of the Year
| 
| 
|-

Australian Music Prize
The Australian Music Prize (the AMP) is an annual award of $30,000 given to an Australian band or solo artist in recognition of the merit of an album released during the year of award. The commenced in 2005.

|-
| 2012
| Warm in the Darkness
| Australian Music Prize
| 
|-

EG Awards
The EG Awards) are an annual awards night celebrating Victorian music. 

|-
| rowspan="2"| EG Awards of 2012
| Warm in the Darkness
| Best Album
| 
|-
| Liz Stringer
| Best Female 
|

Music Victoria Awards
The Music Victoria Awards, are an annual awards night celebrating Victorian music. They commenced in 2013, replacing the EG Awards.

! 
|-
| 2021
| Liz Stringer
| Best Solo Artist
| 
|
|-

References

Australian women guitarists
Australian women singer-songwriters
Living people
Australian rock singers
21st-century Australian singers
21st-century Australian women singers
21st-century guitarists
Year of birth missing (living people)
21st-century women guitarists